Willemstad is the capital city of Curaçao, an island in the southern Caribbean Sea that forms a constituent country of the Kingdom of the Netherlands. It was the capital of the Netherlands Antilles prior to its dissolution in 2010. The historic centre of the city consists of four quarters: the Punda and Otrobanda, which are separated by the Sint Anna Bay, an inlet that leads into the large natural harbour called the Schottegat, as well as the Scharloo and Pietermaai Smal quarters, which are across from each other on the smaller Waaigat harbour. Willemstad is home to the Curaçao synagogue, the oldest surviving synagogue in the Americas. The city centre, with its unique architecture and harbour entry, has been designated a UNESCO World Heritage Site.

History
Punda was established in 1634, when the Dutch captured the island from Spain. The original name of Punda was de punt in Dutch. The city was constructed as a walled city. It soon developed into one of the major centres of the Atlantic slave trade which triggered a rapid population growth. In 1674, the Curaçao synagogue was built by Sephardic Portuguese Jews from Amsterdam and Recife, Brazil who had settled in the city as traders. In the late 17th century, there were over 200 houses within the city walls. 

In 1675, it was decided to construct the town of Pietermaai outside of the enclosed city. It was to be separated from the city by an area of about 500 metres in which construction was not allowed as not to obstruct the canons in Fort Amsterdam. In 1707, the suburb of Otrobanda was founded. Otrobanda would become the cultural centre of Willemstad. Its name originated from the Papiamentu otro banda, which means "the opposite side". The suburb of Scharloo followed, however Willemstad continued to experience growth. By 1818, the population of Willemstad had grown to 9,536 people. On 13 May 1861, a decision was made to demolish the city walls, and built residential houses in the gap separating Willemstad from Pietermaai. 

Around 1925, the booming oil and phosphate industry further stimulated growth, and resulted in the creation of new neighbourhoods. Between 1945 and 1955, Julianadorp and Emmastad were created by Royal Dutch Shell to house the new workers.  In 1985, the oil refinery which employed 12,000 people was closed down by Shell. The Government of Curaçao decided to buy the refinery for ƒ 1.00 and take responsibility for all future pollution claims. In 1986, it was leased to the Venezuelan PDVSA, and reopened on a limited scale. In 2017, the PDVSA was hit by punitive sanctions of the United States Government, and attempts have been made to seize the refinery. 

On 30 May 1969, the Curaçao uprising, a strike at a subcontractor of the oil refinery, turned into a riot. The riot resulted in two deaths, 300 arrests and a part of the historic centre burnt down. The Netherlands Marine Corps was sent to Willemstad and the entire city centre was closed down. In 1997, the centre of Willemstad and its former suburbs were designated a UNESCO World Heritage Site. In the 21st century, a large scale program of renovation started.

Economy

Aviation
Jetair Caribbean, the national airline of Curaçao, has its corporate head office in Maduro Plaza.

Tourism

Tourism is a major industry and the city has several casinos. The city centre of Willemstad has an array of colonial architecture that is influenced by Dutch styles. Archaeological research has also been developed there. The city is also home to several beaches like Baya Beach.

Industry
Owing to its location near the Venezuelan oilfields, its political stability and its natural deep water harbour, Willemstad became the site of an important seaport and refinery.  Willemstad's harbour is one of the largest oil handling ports in the Caribbean.  The refinery, at one point the largest in the world, was originally built and owned by Royal Dutch Shell in 1915.

The four companies comprising the Royal Dutch Shell refining operation; the actual refinery, oil bunkering, the tugboat company (KTK) and the local distribution of refined products (CurOli/Gas) were each sold to the government of Curaçao in 1985 for the symbolic sum of one guilder per company, or a total of 1 guilder and is now leased to PDVSA, the state owned Venezuelan oil company. Schlumberger, the world's largest oil field services company is incorporated in Willemstad.

Financial services
Numerous financial institutions are incorporated in Willemstad due to Curaçao's favourable tax policies.

Education
The University of Curaçao is the national university of Curaçao and located in Willemstad. The Avalon University School of Medicine is located in Willemstad. The Caribbean Medical University is also located in Willemstad, close to the city centre.

Sports
Major League Baseball players Jair Jurrjens, Wladimir Balentien, Jurickson Profar, Andruw Jones, Ozzie Albies, Kenley Jansen and Jonathan Schoop are from Willemstad.

Noted tennis doubles player Jean-Julien Rojer was born in Willemstad.

In 1985, Willemstad hosted the Curaçao Grand Prix for Formula 3000. The race was won by Danish racing driver John Nielsen. Pabao Little League has appeared in nine Little League World Series, winning in 2004. They were crowned the International Champions in 2005, 2019, and 2022. In 2008, another Pabao Little League team won the Junior League World Series, after winning the Latin America Region, then defeating the Asia-Pacific Region and Mexico Region champions to become the International champion, and finally defeating the U.S. champion (West Region), Hilo American/National LL (Hilo, Hawaii), 5–2.

Infrastructure

Airport

Bridges
Punda and Otrobanda are connected by Queen Emma Bridge, a long pontoon bridge. Although it is still in use, these days most road traffic now uses the Queen Juliana Bridge built in 1967 (rebuilt 1974) which arches high over the bay further inland. Nearby is also the now non-functioning Queen Wilhelmina drawbridge.

Geography

Climate
Willemstad has a hot semi-arid climate (Köppen climate classification: BSh) with very hot temperatures year round with very warm nights. Sunshine is plentiful year round. Rainfall peaks from October to December, but is extremely variable from year to year due to the influence of the El Niño Southern Oscillation.

Notable people

 Kemy Agustien, footballer
 Ozzie Albies, Major League Baseball player
 Tahith Chong, footballer
 Rebecca Cohen Henriquez, activist
 Guliano Diaz, former professional footballer
 Luigison V. Doran, footballer
 Jan Helenus Ferguson, Colonial governor of the Dutch Gold Coast
 Elson Hooi, footballer
 Andruw Jones, baseball player
 George Maduro, World War II resistance member and recipient of the Military Order of William
 Manuel Piar, general-in-chief of the army during the Venezuelan War of Independence
 Jean-Julien Rojer, tennis player
 Gerrit Schotte, 1st Prime Minister of Curaçao
 Jonathan Schoop, baseball player
 Kenley Jansen, Major League Baseball pitcher

Gallery

References

Bibliography

External links

 
1634 establishments in the Dutch Republic
Capitals in the Caribbean
Populated places established in 1634
Populated places in Curaçao